Sar Kamari (also Romanized as Sar Kamarī; also known as Sar Khemrī) is a village in Zalian Rural District, Zalian District, Shazand County, Markazi Province, Iran. At the 2006 census, its population was 73, in 20 families.

References 

Populated places in Shazand County